This article is an index of lists of human genes.

By chromosome
Below is a list of articles on human chromosomes, each of which contains an incomplete list of genes located on that chromosome.

 Chromosome 1 (human)
 Chromosome 2 (human)
 Chromosome 3 (human)
 Chromosome 4 (human)
 Chromosome 5 (human)
 Chromosome 6 (human)
 Chromosome 7 (human)
 Chromosome 8 (human)
 Chromosome 9 (human)
 Chromosome 10 (human)
 Chromosome 11 (human)
 Chromosome 12 (human)
 Chromosome 13 (human)
 Chromosome 14 (human)
 Chromosome 15 (human)
 Chromosome 16 (human)
 Chromosome 17 (human)
 Chromosome 18 (human)
 Chromosome 19 (human)
 Chromosome 20 (human)
 Chromosome 21 (human)
 Chromosome 22 (human)
 Chromosome X (human)
 Chromosome Y (human)

Protein-coding genes
The lists below constitute a complete list of all known human protein-coding genes.

Transcription factors
This is a list of 1639 genes which encode proteins that are known or expected to function as human transcription factors.
List of human transcription factors

See also 

 List of enzymes
 List of proteins
 List of disabled human pseudogenes

References

External links 
iHOP-Protein Information Database
NextBio-Life Science Search Engine
Entrez-Cross Database Query Search System
TranscriptomeBrowser

Genetics-related lists